1906 Naef (prov. designation:) is a stony vestoid asteroid from the inner regions of the asteroid belt, approximately 7 kilometers in diameter. It was discovered on 5 September 1972, by Swiss astronomer Paul Wild at Zimmerwald Observatory near Bern, Switzerland. It was later named after Swiss banker and amateur astronomer Robert A. Naef.

Orbit and classification 

Naef orbits the Sun in the inner main-belt at a distance of 2.1–2.7 AU once every 3 years and 8 months (1,335 days). Its orbit has an eccentricity of 0.14 and an inclination of 6° with respect to the ecliptic. The body's observation arc begins with its official discovery observation at Zimmerwald, as previous observation at Turku Observatory and McDonald Observatory in 1943 and 1952, respectively, remain unused.

Physical characteristics 

According to observations by the Wide-field Infrared Survey Explorer's NEOWISE mission, Naef measures 7.9 and 8.1 kilometers in diameter, and its surface has an albedo of 0.23, while the Collaborative Asteroid Lightcurve Link assumes an albedo of 0.40 and calculates a diameter of 6.6 kilometer with an absolute magnitude of 12.5.

Naef is a vestoid or V-type asteroid, with its spectral type comparable to that of the group's namesake, 4 Vesta. V-type asteroids are less common than the abundant S-type asteroids, but they are similar in their stony composition, except for their higher concentration of pyroxenes, an aluminium-rich silicate mineral. PanSTARRS photometric survey has characterized it as a SQ-type that transitions to the Q-type asteroids.

Four rotational lightcurves, obtained during 2005–2009, gave a well-defined rotation period between 11.01 and 11.03 hours, and a brightness variation of 0.92–0.95 magnitude.

Naming 

This minor planet was named after Swiss banker Robert A. Naef (1907–1975) from Zürich, an ardent amateur astronomer, who produced the yearly observers almanac, Der Sternenhimmel, since 1940. The official  was published by the Minor Planet Center on 18 April 1977.

Notes

References

External links 
 The Robert A. Naef Foundation
 Asteroid Lightcurve Database (LCDB), query form (info )
 Dictionary of Minor Planet Names, Google books
 Asteroids and comets rotation curves, CdR – Observatoire de Genève, Raoul Behrend
 Discovery Circumstances: Numbered Minor Planets (1)-(5000) – Minor Planet Center
 
 

001906
Discoveries by Paul Wild (Swiss astronomer)
Named minor planets
001906
19720905